Gäwers is a village in Ak bugdaý District, Ahal Region, in southern Turkmenistan. It is the easternmost village of the traditional Ahal Teke tribal territory.

Transportation
Gäwers is served by the M37 highway, the Trans-Caspian Railway, and a small agricultural airfield.

References

Populated places in Ahal Region